Helen Amos (born 30 June 1948) is an Australian former professional tennis player.

Amos, a South Australian, was a quarter-finalist at the 1966 Australian Championships.

At the 1968 US Open she was scheduled to meet Billie Jean King in the first round, for the tournament's inaugural open-era match, but got replaced at the last minute when she didn't show up in time.

References

External links
 
 

1948 births
Living people
Australian female tennis players
Tennis people from South Australia